Donald Johansson (August 29, 1913 – 9 September, 2004) was a Swedish cross-country skier who competed in the 1930s. He won a bronze medal in the 4 × 10 km relay at the 1938 FIS Nordic World Ski Championships in Lahti.

Cross-country skiing results

World Championships
 1 medal – (1 bronze)

External links
World Championship results 

1913 births
2004 deaths
Swedish male cross-country skiers
FIS Nordic World Ski Championships medalists in cross-country skiing
20th-century Swedish people